This article lists the largest law firms in the United States by total number of attorneys. The table is also sortable by total number of partners, associates, and total revenue.

See also
List of largest law firms by revenue
List of largest United States-based law firms by profits per partner
List of largest United Kingdom-based law firms by revenue
List of largest Canada-based law firms by revenue
List of largest Europe-based law firms by revenue
List of largest Japan-based law firms by head count
List of largest China-based law firms by revenue

References

US
United States-based law firms